Frances Emily Kitching (born 17 February 1998) is an English footballer who plays as a goalkeeper for FA Women's Championship Club Crystal Palace. She has previously played for Sheffield United, Liverpool, Chelsea, and Watford.

Career 
Kitching joined the academy at Sheffield United at the age of 10, with her family being lifelong fans of the club. After graduating from the Sheffield United Regional Talent Club, she joined Chelsea in 2015, becoming the club's third-choice goalkeeper. In 2016, she made her competitive debut against London Bees in the FA Women's Continental League Cup. Kitching made her debut in the WSL on the 30 April 2017 in which Chelsea beat Yeovil Town 6–0.

For the 2017/18 season, Kitching joined Watford on loan. She made her competitive debut for the club in a 3–1 loss to Oxford United on the 2 October. In June 2018, Kitching returned to Sheffield United, however in August 2018, she joined Liverpool.

Kitching returned again to Sheffield United for the 2020–21 FA Women's Championship season.

References

External links 
 

1998 births
English women's footballers
Women's association football goalkeepers
Women's Super League players
Liverpool F.C. Women players
Chelsea F.C. Women players
Living people
Watford F.C. Women players
Sheffield United W.F.C. players
Women's Championship (England) players
England women's youth international footballers